Älska mig (en:Love Me) is a Swedish comedy-drama television series. It premiered on Viaplay on 11 October 2019 and 10 April 2020 on SVT. The series is written and directed by Josephine Bornebusch who also plays the lead. The series got a second season which started airing on Viaplay on 13 April 2020. The series won the Kristallen Award in the category "TV drama series of the Year 2020".

Cast 
 Josephine Bornebusch – Clara
 Johan Ulveson – Sten
 Gustav Lindh – Aron
 Sverrir Gudnason – Peter
 Dilan Gwyn – Elsa
 Sofia Karemyr – Jenny
 Nina Zanjani – Sasha
 Görel Crona – Anita
 Ia Langhammer – Kersti
 Christopher Wagelin – Vincent
 Edvin Ryding – Viktor
 Henrik Schyffert – Thomas

References

2020 Swedish television seasons